UFC Live: Jones vs. Matyushenko (also known as UFC on Versus 2) was a mixed martial arts event held by the Ultimate Fighting Championship on Sunday, August 1, 2010, at the Valley View Casino Center in San Diego, California.

Background
The event was initially scheduled to take place at the EnergySolutions Arena in Salt Lake City, Utah. On June 14, 2010, the promotion decided to move the event to a different venue and location due to low ticket sales. The event was the second UFC event to be broadcast on Versus; the first being UFC Live: Vera vs. Jones.

Jim Miller and Gleison Tibau were set to fight at this event, but the bout was later moved to UFC Fight Night: Marquardt vs. Palhares the following month.

Two bouts were moved to this event due to visa issues; Paul Kelly vs. Jacob Volkmann from UFC 116 and Darren Elkins vs. Charles Oliveira from The Ultimate Fighter 11 Finale.

Joe Stevenson suffered a knee injury in training and was unable to fight Takanori Gomi. Stevenson was replaced by Tyson Griffin.

Willamy Freire also suffered an injury in training, forcing the cancellation of his fight with Thiago Tavares. Tavares was then pulled from the card altogether.

"Big" John McCarthy was a referee at this event, the first time he has refereed at a UFC event in almost 3 years.

Damarques Johnson originally weighed in at 172.5 pounds, 1.5 pounds over the contracted weight limit. After being granted one hour to make the original 171 pound limit, Johnson tipped the scales at 172 pounds. As a result, Johnson forfeited 20% of his purse for the fight.

The event drew an estimated 991,000 viewers on Versus.

Results

Bonus awards
Fighters were awarded $40,000 bonuses.

Fight of the Night: Brian Stann vs. Mike Massenzio
Knockout of the Night: Takanori Gomi
Submission of the Night: Charles Oliveira

Reported Payout
The following is the reported payout to the fighters as reported to the California State Athletic Commission. It does not include sponsor money or "locker room" bonuses often given by the UFC and also do not include the UFC's traditional "fight night" bonuses.

Jon Jones $46,000 ($23,000 win bonus) def. Vladimir Matyushenko $31,000
Yushin Okami $46,000 ($23,000 win bonus) def. Mark Muñoz $22,000
Jake Ellenberger $24,000 ($12,000 win bonus) def. John Howard $15,000
Takanori Gomi $80,000 ($40,000 win bonus) def. Tyson Griffin $30,000
Jacob Volkmann $20,000 ($10,000 win bonus) def. Paul Kelly $17,000
Matt Riddle $24,000 ($12,000 win bonus) def. DaMarques Johnson $10,000 ^
Igor Pokrajac $12,000 ($6,000 win bonus) def. James Irvin $20,000
Brian Stann $34,000 ($17,000 win bonus) def. Mike Massenzio $5,000
Charles Oliveira $12,000 ($6,000 win bonus) def. Darren Elkins $8,000
Rob Kimmons $18,000 ($9,000 win bonus) def. Steve Steinbeiss $6,000

^ DaMarques Johnson was reportedly fined 20 percent of his purse for failing to make the 170-pound welterweight limit. The CSAC's initial report did not include information on the penalty.

References

See also
 Ultimate Fighting Championship
 List of UFC champions
 List of UFC events
 2010 in UFC

UFC on Versus
2010 in mixed martial arts
Mixed martial arts in San Diego
Sports competitions in San Diego
2010 in sports in California
Events in San Diego